Zukelwa Cwaba (born 15 October 1984) is a South African netball player.  She plays in the positions of GK, GD, GS and GA. She is a member of the South Africa national netball team and has competed in the 2010 Commonwealth Games in Delhi, the 2007 World Netball Championships in Auckland and the 2011 World Netball Championships in Singapore. She has also participated in the 2011 World Netball Series in Liverpool, UK.

References

1984 births
Living people
Commonwealth Games competitors for South Africa
Netball players at the 2010 Commonwealth Games
South African netball players
2011 World Netball Championships players